Hiletinae is a subfamily of beetles in the family Carabidae, containing 21 species in two genera. All of the species in the genus Hiletus, as well as 6 species in Eucamaragnathus, live in Africa. The other species in Eucamaragnathus live in either Southeast Asia and India, or in South America.

Classification 

 Genus Eucamaragnathus Jeannel, 1938
 Eucamaragnathus amapa Erwin & Stork, 1985
 Eucamaragnathus angulicollis (Jeannel, 1938)
 Eucamaragnathus aterrimus (Jeannel, 1938)
 Eucamaragnathus batesii (Chaudoir, 1861)
 Eucamaragnathus bocandei (Alluaud, 1914)
 Eucamaragnathus borneensis Erwin & Stork, 1985
 Eucamaragnathus brasiliensis (Negre, 1966)
 Eucamaragnathus castelnaui (Bocande, 1849)
 Eucamaragnathus desenderi Assmann, Drees, Matern & Schuldt, 2011
 Eucamaragnathus fissipennis (Ancey, 1882)
 Eucamaragnathus jaws Erwin & Stork, 1985
 Eucamaragnathus oxygonus (Chaudoir, 1861)
 Eucamaragnathus spiniger (Andrewes, 1947)
 Eucamaragnathus suberbiei (Alluaud, 1914)
 Eucamaragnathus sumatrensis (Oberthur, 1883)
 Genus Hiletus Schiodte, 1847
 Hiletus alluaudi Jeannel, 1938
 Hiletus fossulatus Jeannel, 1938
 Hiletus jeanneli Negre, 1966
 Hiletus katanganus Basilewsky, 1948
 Hiletus nimba Erwin & Stork, 1985
 Hiletus versutus Schiodte, 1847
 Hiletus walterrossii Allegro & Giachino, 2017

References

 
Carabidae subfamilies